Margarete is a German feminine given name. It is derived from Ancient Greek margarites (μαργαρίτης), meaning "the pearl". Via the Latin margarita, it arrived in the German sprachraum. Related names in English include Daisy, Greta, Gretchen, Madge, Mae, Mag, Magee, Magdy, Magga, Maggie, Maggy, Maidie, Maisie, Marg, Margaret, Marguerite, Margarita, Margareta, Margarida, Marge, Margery, Marget, Margo, Margot, Marjorie, Marjory, Matge, May, Meg, Megan, Mairead, Mer, Meta, Rita, Molly, Peg and Peggy.

People named Margarete 
Margarete Weißkirchner (1460–1500), commoner and common-law spouse of Philip I, Count of Hanau-Münzenberg
Margarete of Brunswick-Wolfenbüttel (1516 or 1517–1580), a princess of Brunswick-Wolfenbüttel by birth, Duchess of Münsterberg, Oels and Bernstadt by marriage
Princess Margarete Karola of Saxony (1900–1962), Duchess of Saxony, Princess of Hohenzollern by marriage
Archduchess Margarete Sophie of Austria (1870–1902), Archduchess of Austria and Princess of Bohemia, Hungary, and Tuscany by birth, Duchess of Württemberg by marriage
Archduchess Margarethe Klementine of Austria (1870–1955), Archduchess of Austria and Princess of Bohemia, Hungary, and Tuscany by birth, Princess of Thurn and Taxis by marriage
Margarete Adler (1896–1990), Austrian freestyle swimmer, diver and gymnastics teacher, first Austrian woman Summer Olympics medalist (with her relay teammates)
Margarete Bagshaw (1964–2015), American painter and potter
Margarete Bieber (1879–1978), Jewish German art historian, classical archaeologist and professor, the second woman university professor in Germany
Margarete Böhme (1867–1939), German writer
Margarete Bonnevie (1884–1970), Norwegian author, feminist and politician
Margarete Buber-Neumann (1901–1989), German writer, communist and later anti-communist
Margarete Cranmer (d. c. 1571), second wife of the reformation Archbishop of Canterbury, Thomas Cranmer  
Margarete Depner (1885–1970), Romanian sculptor, painter and illustrator
Margarete Dessoff (1874–1944), German choral conductor, singer and voice teacher
Margarete Gussow (born 1896), German astronomer
Margarete Haagen (1889–1966), German stage and film actress
Margarete Haimberger-Tanzer (1916–1987), Austrian lawyer, prosecutor and judge
Margarete Heymann (1899–1990), German ceramic artist
Margarete Hilferding (1871–1942), Austrian Jewish teacher, doctor, individual psychologist and first woman admitted into the Vienna Psychoanalytic Society
Margarete Himmler (1893–1967), wife of Reichsführer-SS Heinrich Himmler
Margarete Kahn (1880–1942?), German mathematician and Holocaust victim
Grete Keilson (1905–1999), German communist politician
Margarete Klose (1899–1968), German operatic mezzo-soprano
Margarete Kollisch (1893–1979), Austrian writer and poet
Margarete Kupfer (1881–1953), German actress
Margarete Lanner (1896–1981), German stage and film actress
Margarete Mitscherlich-Nielsen (1917–2012), German psychoanalyst
Margarete Neumann (1917–2002), German writer and lyrical poet
Margarete Pioresan (born 1956), Brazilian former football goalkeeper
Margarete Robsahm (born 1942), Norwegian model, actress and director
Margarete Schlegel (1899–1987), German actress
Margarete Schütte-Lihotzky (1897–2000), first female Austrian architect and communist anti-Nazi resistance member
Margarete Schön (1895–1985), German stage and film actress
Margarete Seeler (1909–1996),  German-born American artist, designer, educator, and author; known for her cloisonné work.
Margarete Sommer (1893–1965), German Catholic social worker and lay Dominican who saved Jews from the Holocaust
Margarete Steffin (1908–1941), German actress and writer, one of Bertold Brecht's lovers and closest collaborators
Margarete Steiff (1847–1909), German seamstress who founded Margarete Steiff GmbH, the toy stuffed animal manufacturer
Margarete Teschemacher (1903–1959), German operatic soprano
Margarete Wallmann (1901 or 1904–1992), ballerina, choreographer, stage designer and opera director in Austria
Margarete von Wrangell (1877–1932), Baltic German agricultural chemist, the first female full professor at a German university

Feminine given names
German feminine given names
Given names derived from gemstones